Tece is a neighborhood in Mersin, Turkey.

Formerly Tece was a small village located in the citrus plantation. But due to its proximity to Mersin and recent housing projects, its population increased sharply.  In 1990s the population increased to over 1246 and a municipality was established in Tece. However in 2008 by the act no 5747, the municipality was disestablished and Tece was made a neighborhood of Mezitli which itself is a second level municipality of Mersin Metropolitan municipality.

Tece is known by its ancient castle and its creek. The Mersin municipality now runs a project of coastal area. The project will include walking trails, bicycle roads, play grounds, fitness centers, sport courts and coffeehouses between Mersin and Tece.

References

Mersin